Arneburg-Goldbeck is a Verbandsgemeinde ("collective municipality") in the district of Stendal, in Saxony-Anhalt, Germany. Before 1 January 2010, it was a Verwaltungsgemeinschaft. It is situated on the left bank of the Elbe, north of Stendal. The seat of the Verbandsgemeinde is in Goldbeck.

The Verbandsgemeinde Arneburg-Goldbeck consists of the following municipalities:

Arneburg
Eichstedt 
Goldbeck
Hassel
Hohenberg-Krusemark 
Iden 
Rochau 
Werben

References

Verbandsgemeinden in Saxony-Anhalt